The World Monuments Watch is a flagship advocacy program of the New York-based private non-profit organization World Monuments Fund (WMF) that calls international attention to cultural heritage around the world that is threatened by neglect, vandalism, conflict, or disaster.

2016 Watch List
The 2016 Watch List was published on 15 October 2015.

References

Historic preservation
2015 works